Avion Carlos Black (born April 24, 1977) is a former American football wide receiver and return specialist in the National Football League. Drafted by the Buffalo Bills fourth round of the 2000 NFL Draft, Avion played two seasons in Buffalo (2000–2001) and one season with the Houston Texans (2002).

Personal life
Avion is the elder of two children, born to Avion Carl Black and Dorothy Elizabeth Johns of Nashville, Tennessee.  He has one sister, Carla Johns.  Avion is married to the former Shakeyah Thompson. The couple have one son, AJ and one daughter, Kennedi.

References

1977 births
Living people
People from Nashville, Tennessee
Players of American football from Tennessee
American football wide receivers
Tennessee State Tigers football players
Buffalo Bills players
Houston Texans players